The Wisconsin Canoe Heritage Museum, located in Spooner, Wisconsin, United States, is a museum dedicated to preserving the history of the canoe. It is the only museum located in the United States that is exclusively dedicated to the preservation and interpretation of the cultural heritage of North American canoe.

The museum was built by volunteers and located in the former Baker Grain Elevator building with funding assistance from the city of Spooner. It opened in May 2010.

The museum's Exhibit Hall features displays of canoes and canoe related ephemera. It includes craft from the golden age of North American canoeing as well as work by contemporary builders. The building traditions of the eastern seaboard, the midwest, and Canada are represented. Its Canoe Shop is a  facility designed support a new generation of builders and canoe restorers.

Other museums with canoes 
The world's largest dedicated canoe museum, the Canadian Canoe Museum, is located in Peterborough, Ontario.

There are other museums in the U. S. that include canoes in their collections of boats. These include the Thousand Islands Museum, Clayton, New York, the Mystic Seaport Museum, Mystic, Connecticut, and the Adirondack Museum, Blue Mountain Lake, New York.

References

External links
 Wisconsin Canoe Heritage Museum - official site

Museums established in 2010
Museums in Washburn County, Wisconsin
Maritime museums in Wisconsin
Canoeing in the United States
2010 establishments in Wisconsin